The 1998 U.S. Open Cup ran from June through October, 1998, open to all soccer teams in the United States.

The first-year Major League Soccer club Chicago Fire won the Cup with a 2–1 overtime victory over the Columbus Crew at Soldier Field in Chicago, Illinois.

In the early rounds of the tournament, only one MLS team lost to a minor-league side, when the A-League's Nashville Metros beat the Kansas City Wizards 3–1.

Open Cup Bracket
Home teams listed on top of bracket

First round
Eight D3 Pro, four PDL, and four USASA teams start.

Second round
Eight A-League enter.

Third round
Eight MLS enter.

Quarterfinals

Semifinals

Final

Top scorers

See also
 United States Soccer Federation
 U.S. Open Cup
 Major League Soccer
 United Soccer Leagues
 USASA
 National Premier Soccer League

External links
 U.S. Open Cup 1998 at TheCup.us

Cup
U.S. Open Cup